The Pan-Pacific Auditorium was a landmark structure in the Fairfax District of Los Angeles, California. It once stood near the site of Gilmore Field, an early Los Angeles baseball venue predating Dodger Stadium. It was located within sight of both CBS Television City on the southeast corner of Beverly and Fairfax Avenue and the Farmers Market on the northeast corner of Third Street and Fairfax. For over 35 years it was the premier location for indoor public events in Los Angeles. The facility was closed in 1972, beginning 17 years of steady neglect and decay. In 1978, the Pan-Pacific Auditorium was included in the National Register of Historic Places, but eleven years later the sprawling wooden structure was destroyed in a fire.

Architectural icon
Built by event promoters Phillip and Cliff Henderson and designed by Los Angeles architects Wurdeman & Becket, the Pan-Pacific Auditorium opened to a fanfare of Boy Scout bugles on May 18, 1935 for a 16-day model home exhibition. The widely known and much photographed facade belied a modest rectilinear wooden structure resembling an overgrown gymnasium inside and out. The auditorium sprawled across  and had seating for up to 6,000.

Throughout the following 30 years the Pan-Pacific would host the Ice Capades and the Harlem Globetrotters, serve as home to the Los Angeles Monarchs of the Pacific Coast Hockey League along with UCLA ice hockey, UCLA men's basketball, USC men's basketball, professional tennis, car shows, political rallies and circuses. During the 1940s it was used for audience-attended national radio broadcasts and in the 1950s for televised professional wrestling shows. At its height, most major indoor events in Los Angeles were held at the Pan-Pacific. Leopold Stokowski conducted there in 1936, 1950s actress Jeanne Crain was crowned "Miss Pan Pacific" there in the early 1940s, General Dwight D. Eisenhower spoke to a beyond-capacity crowd of 10,000 in 1952 a month before being elected President of the United States, Elvis Presley performed there in 1957 shortly before he was drafted into the Army and Vice President Richard Nixon addressed a national audience from the Pan-Pacific in November 1960. The building carried on as Los Angeles' primary indoor venue until the 1972 opening of the much larger Los Angeles Convention Center, after which the Pan-Pacific Auditorium was closed.

Decay and fire

There were hopes throughout the surrounding Fairfax District towards refurbishing the Pan-Pacific, possibly as an ice rink or cultural center and the parking lot soon became a park. However, the building was neglected for many years and damaged by small fires started by transients.

In 1975, the Pan-Pacific made a brief appearance as the entrance to the NBC Studios in Hollywood for the movie Funny Lady. Interest in the building was rekindled somewhat with its 1978 inclusion in the National Register of Historic Places. The 1980 release of the movie musical Xanadu brought renewed hopes the building might be saved when the auditorium's facade was used to portray a dilapidated building which became a sparkling, brightly lit roller disco nightclub, but the movie was critically panned and not an economic success. It also appears at the beginning of the 1980 music video for the Barnes & Barnes song "Fish Heads". Black-and-white film footage of a man with a jet pack flying from left to right in front of the facade was used in the video for the 1981 Devo single, "Beautiful World". The dilapidated façade was used in the video for "Dancing in the Sheets" by Shalamar. Its final appearance was in the 1988 movie Miracle Mile.

The auditorium continued to deteriorate throughout the 1980s, mostly owing to neglect. A large loading door on the southeast corner was often forced open, allowing free access to anyone. A fire in May 1983 damaged the northern end. On the evening of May 24, 1989 (six days after the 54th anniversary of its opening), the Pan-Pacific Auditorium was destroyed by a fire, the smoke from which was visible throughout the Los Angeles basin.

Site today
The site is now part of Pan-Pacific Park. An urban park with a recreation center, designed as a scaled-down replica of one of the famous towers, opened in 2002.

Pop culture

The facade of the building was used in the motion picture Xanadu, in which a muse (a daughter of Zeus) convinces two men to convert the classic but decaying building into a music and entertainment venue. Through special effects, the building is transformed to outshine the building in its heyday.

The video for "She's My Girl" by The Babys featured the band playing in front of, as well as on top of the building and its iconic flagpole facades.

Similarly, The Producers' 1982 music video "She Sheila" was partly filmed in front of the facade.

The 1984 motion picture Ghost Warrior, in which a deep-frozen 400-year-old samurai is shipped to Los Angeles, where he comes back to life, includes scenes of both the seriously decayed façade and the dimly lit interior. In the interior shots, the columns with angled knee bracing and the distinctive arched bowstring trusses are briefly visible.

The music video for the 1988 song "Going Back to Cali" by LL Cool J has a black and white photograph of the building in the opening sequence.

A nearly full-scale, stylized replica of the façade opened as the main entrance to Disney's Hollywood Studios theme park at the Walt Disney World Resort in Bay Lake, Florida on May 1, 1989, just three weeks before the original was destroyed by fire.

Disney California Adventure Park, at the Disneyland Resort, opened new entrance gates in the style of the Pan-Pacific's façade on July 15, 2011.

References

External links

LAistory: The Pan Pacific Auditorium - Historical pictures and article
Pan Pacific Auditorium, short history and photo gallery
Pan-Pacific Auditorium Playground
Reference to the front gate of Disney's Hollywood Studios at Walt Disney World, Florida
 Colorized postcard of Gilmore Stadium, Gilmore Field, Pan Pacific Auditorium and Farmers Market 

Demolished buildings and structures in Los Angeles
Demolished theatres in Los Angeles
Fairfax, Los Angeles
Sports venues in Los Angeles
Commercial buildings completed in 1935
Buildings and structures demolished in 1989
Burned buildings and structures in the United States
Former National Register of Historic Places in California
Los Angeles Historic-Cultural Monuments
National Register of Historic Places in Los Angeles
Theatres on the National Register of Historic Places in California
Basketball venues in Los Angeles
UCLA Bruins basketball venues
USC Trojans basketball venues
Indoor arenas in Los Angeles
Indoor ice hockey venues in Los Angeles
Tennis venues in Los Angeles
Event venues established in 1935
1935 establishments in California
1989 disestablishments in California
1930s architecture in the United States
Welton Becket buildings
Streamline Moderne architecture in California